Nationality words link to articles with information on the nation's poetry or literature (for instance, Irish or France).

Events

Works published

France
 Pierre de Ronsard:
 Bocage
 Meslanges
 Hugh Salel, Tombeau poétique de Hugues Salel a posthumous edition prepared by Olivier de Magny of Salel's translation of Books 11 and 12 of the Iliad of Homer; Paris: Vincent Sertenas

Great Britain
 Miles Huggarde, The Assault of the Sacrament of the Altar, written 1549; non-elite opposition to the Reformation
 Henry Howard, Earl of Surrey, The Fourthe Boke of Virgill, Intreating of the Love Betweene Aeneas & Dido (see also Certain Bokes 1557)
 Sir David Lyndsay (also spelled "David Lindsay"), The Monarche, includes other works by the author

Other
 Giraldi Cinthio, Discoursi intorno al comporre dei romanzi, commedie, e tragedie ("Discourses on Composing Romances, Comedies, and Tragedies"), Italian criticism
 Friedrich Dedekind, Grobiana, an enlarged version of Grobianus, a poem written by a German in Latin elegiac verse first published in 1549; enormously popular across Continental Europe (see also Grobianus et Grobiana: sive, de morum simplicitate, libri tres 1558)
 Longinus, Dionysi Longini rhetoris praestantissimi liber de grandi sive sublimiorationis genere ... cum adnotationibus, ("On the Sublime"), first modern edition published by Francis Robortello in Basel, Switzerland

Births
Death years link to the corresponding "[year] in poetry" article:
 Bálint Balassi (died 1594), Hungarian lyric poet
 Sir Philip Sidney (died 1586), English poet and scholar
 Fulke Greville, 1st Baron Brooke (died 1628), Elizabethan poet, dramatist, and statesman

Deaths
Birth years link to the corresponding "[year] in poetry" article:
 Gutierre de Cetina (born 1519), Spanish poet and soldier
 Robert Wedderburn died about this year (born c. 1510), Scottish

See also

 Poetry
 16th century in poetry

Notes

16th-century poetry
Poetry